The Punishment is a 1912 American short silent drama film directed by D. W. Griffith and starring Blanche Sweet.

Cast
 Blanche Sweet as The Fruit Grower's Daughter
 J. Jiquel Lanoe as The Father
 Kate Bruce as The Mother
 William J. Butler as The Landowner
 Christy Cabanne as The Landowner's Son
 Harry Hyde as Lucien, the Sweetheart
 Frank Opperman as The Old Gardener
 Verner Clarges
 Wilfred Lucas

See also
 D. W. Griffith filmography
 Blanche Sweet filmography

References

External links

1912 films
1912 short films
Silent American drama films
American silent short films
American black-and-white films
1912 drama films
Films directed by D. W. Griffith
1910s American films